St Mary Magdalene, Enfield, is a Church of England church in Enfield, London, dedicated to Jesus' companion, Mary Magdalene. The building is grade II* listed with Historic England.

History
The church was built as a memorial to Philip Twells, MP and city banker, by his wife Georgiana Twells, who employed the architect William Butterfield. The foundation was stone was laid in 1881 and the church opened in 1883. Charles Edgar Buckeridge created much of the interior art.

The tower originally contained 8 change ringing bells cast by John Warner & Sons for the new church in 1883, however these were replaced in 1999, as they were too heavy for the tower and were causing damage. The church installed a new, lighter ring of 8 bells cast by the Whitechapel Bell Foundry, and the older, larger bells were bought by Grace Church Cathedral in Charleston, United States, where they were installed and augmented to 10 with two new treble bells cast in the same year, also by Whitechapel.

Gallery

References

External links

Enfield
Grade II* listed churches in London
Grade II* listed buildings in the London Borough of Enfield
Diocese of London
Enfield, London